Samuel L. Rose (December 19, 1818March 14, 1887) was an American lawyer, judge, and politician.  He was a pioneer settler of Beaver Dam, Wisconsin, and represented that part of the state in the Wisconsin State Senate (1856 & 1857) and State Assembly (1855).  He later served as an Iowa circuit court judge and is the namesake of Rose Grove Township, Hamilton County, Iowa.

His name was incorrectly listed as "Solomon L. Rose" in several editions of the Wisconsin Blue Book.  But all of the obituaries for Samuel L. Rose and the biographies of the Samuel L. Rose in Iowa are consistent with the biographies of the S. L. Rose who resided in Beaver Dam and served in the Wisconsin Legislature.

Early life and education
Samuel L. Rose was born in Augusta, New York, in December 1818.  He was raised and educated there, attending the Augusta Academy for much of his teenage years.  When he was 16, during the winter of 1836, he taught school at Kennett Square, Pennsylvania. Among his students during this term were Bayard Taylor and James P. Wickersham.

While studying at the academy, he delved into medical science, but ultimately decided to focus on law.  After graduating, he went on to read law under the tutelage of Samuel Beardsley in Utica, New York, and later with Timothy Jenkins, in Oneida County.  He was admitted to the bar in 1841, and practiced law in New York until moving west in 1850.

Wisconsin career

Shortly after arriving in Wisconsin, in December 1850, Rose was appointed county judge of Dodge County by Governor Nelson Dewey, to fill the vacancy caused by the resignation of the incumbent judge, George W. Greene.

In February 1852 he helped organize a new Jefferson and Dodge County agricultural society, and became a vice-president for Beaver Dam.; in October, the new Society would hold their first annual county fair, and Rose would serve as a judge in the category of Fruits. He was elected as town chairman (equivalent to mayor) of Beaver Dam in April 1852, which made him ex officio a member of the county board of supervisors. In September 1852 he and Ezra Bowen were on the executive committee of the newly-organized Dodge County Democratic Committee in preparation for the forthcoming general election. In 1853, he was the Democratic nominee for re-election to his position as county judge, and was re-elected without opposition.

Legislative and educational affairs 
He was elected in 1854 to a one-year term as a member of the Wisconsin State Assembly in the 1855 8th Wisconsin Legislature. In the fall of 1855 he was elected to a two-year term as a member of the Wisconsin Senate representing the 22nd Senate district (Dodge County), for 1856 and 1857 (the 9th and 10th Wisconsin Legislatures), succeeding fellow Democrat Ezra Bowen.

When the Legislature chartered Wayland University in January 1855 and Judson Female Seminary in March, Rose was made a trustee of both institutions. The legislature also added him as a new trustee of the Wisconsin Baptist Educational Society, which was permitted to pass part or all of its assets over to Wayland.

Business 
In 1855, Rose was 40% shareholder and President of the Dodge County Bank.

Railroad advocate 
As early as January 1853, Rose was actively participated in a meeting in support of Moses Strong's announced La Crosse and Milwaukee Railroad; and in a convention seeking to have a railroad built between Watertown and Berlin, Wisconsin. When the Berlin and Watertown Railroad was chartered by the Legislature in the spring, Rose was one of the directors designated by the Legislature.

In March 1855, the Legislature of which Rose was now a member chartered the Beaver Dam and Baraboo Railroad Company and the Madison, Fond du Lac and Lake Michigan Railroad Company, making him a director of each of these companies.

In 1857, he moved to Milwaukee, where he was briefly president of the Milwaukee and Western Railroad Company.

Iowa career
In 1862, Rose moved west to Iowa and purchased 1000 acres at a site called "Skunk Grove" in Hamilton County, Iowa.  He purchased the only hotel in the area and opened a post office, where he was named postmaster.  Rose was elected to the Hamilton County board for several years, and through a petition to the state legislature, he was able to get the name of the township changed to "Rose Grove" in 1866.

In 1868, the Iowa Legislature created the new office of circuit court judges in the state judiciary, and at the Fall 1868 election, Rose was elected the first judge of the 2nd circuit in the 11th judicial district.

Death 
In the late 1870s, Rose returned to Beaver Dam.  He died there on March 14, 1887.

Personal life and family
Samuel Rose was a son of Nathaniel Rose, a medical doctor in Oneida County, New York, and his wife Abigail ( Knowles).  Rose's maternal ancestors were said to have arrived in North America aboard the Mayflower.  His paternal grandfather, Timothy Rose, was a private in the Connecticut militia during the American Revolutionary War and was killed in the Wyoming Massacre.  There is no mention of Samuel Rose having a wife or children.

References

 

|-

1818 births
1887 deaths
People from Beaver Dam, Wisconsin
People from Oneida County, New York
19th-century American politicians
Wisconsin Democrats
Wisconsin Republicans
Wisconsin state senators
Members of the Wisconsin State Assembly